Timepidium bromide (INN) is an anticholinergic. It is used in the symptomatic treatment of visceral spasms. It is also used to relieve pain associated with various gastrointestinal disorders. The quaternary nitrogen prevents it from crossing the blood brain barrier, so it is peripherally acting with no central side effects.

The same compound sans the quaternary methyl group and the methoxy ether is called tipepidine.

References

Muscarinic antagonists
Thiophenes
Quaternary ammonium compounds
Piperidines
Ethers
Alkene derivatives
Bromides
Peripherally selective drugs